Jack Douglas Madelin (born 19 April 2002) is a Welsh professional footballer who most recently played as a defender for AFC Wimbledon.

Club career
On 22 October 2019, after progressing through AFC Wimbledon's academy, Madelin made his debut for the club in a 1–0 loss against Burton Albion.  In May 2022 he was announced as leaving AFC Wimbledon at the end of his contract.

International career
In April 2017, Madelin made his debut for Wales under-17 against Switzerland U17, after previously appearing for Wales U16.

Career statistics

References

2002 births
Living people
Footballers from Westminster
Association football forwards
English footballers
Welsh footballers
AFC Wimbledon players
Wales youth international footballers
English Football League players
English people of Welsh descent